Diane Mott Davidson (born ) is an American author of mystery novels that use the theme of food, an idea she got from Robert B. Parker. Several recipes are included in each book, and each novel title is a play on a food or drink word. Her story, "Cold Turkey", won the 1993 Anthony Award for "Best Short-story".

Biography
Mott Davidson studied political science at Wellesley College and lived across the hall from Hillary Clinton. In a few of her novels (particularly, The Cereal Murders), she references a prestigious eastern women's college that her sleuth, Goldy Schulz, attended before transferring to the University of Colorado in Boulder.  In real life, Mott Davidson transferred from Wellesley and eventually graduated from Stanford University.

Career
The main character in Mott Davidson's novels is Goldy Schulz, a small town caterer who also solves murder mysteries in her spare time.  At the start of the series, Goldy is a recently divorced mother with a young son trying to make a living as a caterer in the fictional town of Aspen Meadow, CO.  As the series progresses, new characters are introduced that change Goldy's professional and personal life.  Robin Vidimos  noted that Aspen Meadow, CO, closely resembles a real Colorado town, Evergreen, where Mott Davidson resides with her family.

The series has now reached 17 books.  The first 12 books interwove recipes with the novel's text. When a dish is first described in the novel, the relevant recipe followed within the next few pages. Double Shot, the 12th novel, marked a change in the publishing of these recipes.  In Double Shot, all recipes are compiled and printed at the end of the novel.

She was the guest of honor at the 2007 Great Manhattan Mystery Conclave in Manhattan, Kansas.

Awards
 Mott Davidson was nominated for both the 1991 Anthony Award and the 1990 Agatha Award for Catering to Nobody in the "Best First Novel" category. 
 Her story, "Cold Turkey", won the 1993 Anthony Award for "Best Short-story".

Bibliography

Culinary series

 Catering to Nobody (1990)
 Dying for Chocolate (1993)
 The Cereal Murders (1994)
 The Last Suppers (1995)
 Killer Pancake (1996)
 The Main Corpse (1997)
 The Grilling Season (1998)
 Prime Cut (2000)
 Tough Cookie (2001)
 Sticks and Scones (2002)
 Chopping Spree (2003)
 Double Shot (2005)
 Dark Tort (2007)
 Sweet Revenge (2008)
 Fatally Flaky (2009)
 Crunch Time (2011)
 The Whole Enchilada (2013)

Non-fiction
Goldy’s Kitchen Cookbook: Cooking, Writing, Family, Life (2015)

References

External links
 

1949 births
Living people
Writers from Charlottesville, Virginia
People from Evergreen, Colorado
American mystery novelists
20th-century American novelists
Wellesley College alumni
Stanford University alumni
Anthony Award winners
21st-century American novelists
20th-century American women writers
21st-century American women writers
Women mystery writers
Novelists from Colorado
American women novelists
Novelists from Virginia